Lahošť (until 2006 Lahošt) is a municipality and village in Teplice District in the Ústí nad Labem Region of the Czech Republic. It has about 700 inhabitants.

References

External links

Villages in Teplice District